The 2012 Men's World Floorball Championships were the ninth men's Floorball World Championships. The tournament took place in Bern and Zurich, Switzerland in December 2012.

Qualification

There are five qualification groups for 11 places in the final tournament:
 Americas (2 teams)
 Asia & Oceania (2 teams from 2012 Asia Pacific Floorball Championship)
 Europe (7 teams from three groups)

Five best teams of 2010 World Championships automatically qualified for the competition:

Format
The teams will be drawn into four groups of four. Two best-placed teams of each group will move into quarter-finals. The winners of the Quarter-finals continue to the Semi-finals. The losers of the Semi-finals will play two games and the winners of these games will play for 5th and 6th place and for the losers of these two matches the tournament is over. The 7th team will be the team losing to the team which achieves the 5th place on the tournament. Third and fourth placed teams in the group stage will play for places 9–12 and 13–16 respectively.

Teams

Group stage
The draw was made in the beginning of March.

Final groups

Championship schedule

Preliminary round 
The top two teams from each group advanced to the quarter finals, while the last two teams play in the placement round.

Group A

Group B

Group C

Group D

Playoff round

Quarter finals

Semi-finals

Bronze medal game

Gold medal game

Placement round

13–16

9–12

15th place match

13th place match

11th place match

9th place match

5–8

5th place match

Ranking 
Official 2012 Rankings according to the IFF

References

External links
 Men's World Championships
 Official 2012 Men's World Floorball Championships site

Floorball World Championships
International floorball competitions hosted by Switzerland
2012 in floorball
2012 in Swiss sport
December 2012 sports events in Europe
Sports competitions in Bern
Sports competitions in Zürich
21st century in Bern
21st century in Zürich